Nedumbalam is a village in Thiruvarur district of Tamil Nadu, India.

Villages in Tiruvarur district